is a Japanese professional baseball outfielder for the Orix Buffaloes in Japan's Nippon Professional Baseball.

External links

NPB.com

1985 births
Living people
Baseball people from Shizuoka Prefecture
Japanese baseball players
Nippon Professional Baseball outfielders
Orix Buffaloes players
Japanese baseball coaches
Nippon Professional Baseball coaches